Boystown is a 2007 Spanish comedy film directed by  from a screenplay by Flahn, Félix Sabroso and Dunia Ayaso.

Synopsis 
The plot focuses on the neighborhood of Chueca that is located in Madrid. Victor, an owner of a real-estate company, wants to have a monopoly over all the apartments in Chueca, in order to turn it into the Madrid version of the Castro district in San Francisco, but the apartments are owned by senior citizens that do not want to sell to him. Víctor decides to take matters into his own hands and murder anyone that stands in his way. Everything is going Víctor's way until Rey and Luis, a gay couple, inherit the apartment of Víctor's latest victim. Víctor tries to buy the apartment from Rey but he refuses to sell it because he wants his mother, Doña Antonia, to move into the apartment. Now Víctor has to find a way to kill Doña Antonia while police are out looking for the murderer that is on the loose in Chueca.

Cast

Awards 
The film was awarded Best International Feature at FilmOut San Diego in 2008.

See also 
 List of Spanish films of 2007

References

External links
 
 FilmOut San Diego PDF

Bear (gay culture)
2007 comedy films
Gay-related films
Spanish LGBT-related films
Films based on Spanish comics
Live-action films based on comics
Spanish comedy films
2000s Spanish films
2000s Spanish-language films
Films set in Madrid
Castelao Producciones films
LGBT-related comedy films